Ain't It the Truth is a 1915 short film starring Wallace Beery, Ruth Hennessy and Robert Bolder.  The picture was produced by the Essanay Film Manufacturing Company and distributed by the General Film Company.

External links
 

1915 films
1915 short films
American silent short films
Essanay Studios films
American black-and-white films
1910s American films